The 2009 ICC World Cricket League Division Seven was a cricket tournament held in May 2009 in Guernsey. The tournament was the first stage of qualification structure for the 2015 World Cup as well as part of the wider ICC World Cricket League. The two leading teams of the tournament were promoted to Division Six later the same year.

Teams
The participating teams qualified as follows:

 Bahrain (through 2008 ACC Trophy Elite)
 Gibraltar (through 2008 ECC Division Two)
 Guernsey (through 2008 ECC Division Two)
 Japan (relegated from 2008 Global Division Five)
 Nigeria (through 2008 Africa Division Two)
 Suriname (through 2008 ICC Americas Championship Division One)

Squads

 David Hooper replaced Justin Meades after Guernsey's second match against Japan.

Group stage

Fixtures

Final and Playoffs

Final Placings

Statistics

References

International cricket competitions in 2009
2009, 7